North Kenton is a suburban housing estate in the City of Newcastle upon Tyne, in Tyne and Wear, England, located north west of the city centre and to the east of Kingston Park.

North Kenton is a well known area of Newcastle, it is known to have a strong a community spirit. Once a month the local tenants and residents group known as North Kenton Tenants and Residents Association, the group work all year round to create community events for the whole community. In August every year they plan the annual Family Fun Day with help funding from local business and Newcastle City Council.

In 2016 North Kenton Tenants and Residents Association launched their website 

The area includes a refurbished park, and a sports centre.  Buses operate to West Denton, Newcastle General Hospital, Newcastle upon Tyne and the MetroCentre in Gateshead.

Primary education is provided at Mountfield School and St Cuthberts Primary School; Kenton School is the local high school.

References

Districts of Newcastle upon Tyne